The slaty cuckooshrike (Coracina schistacea) is a species of bird in the family Campephagidae. It is endemic to Indonesia, where it occurs in the Sula and Banggai Islands. Its natural habitats are subtropical or tropical moist lowland forest and subtropical or tropical mangrove forest.

References

slaty cuckooshrike
Birds of Sulawesi
Birds of the Maluku Islands
slaty cuckooshrike
Taxonomy articles created by Polbot